Mass operations of the People's Comissariate of Internal Affairs (NKVD) were carried out during the Great Purge and targeted specific categories of people. As a rule, they were carried out according to the corresponding order of the People's Commissar of Internal Affairs Nikolai Yezhov.

List
Ex-kulaks, criminals, and other anti-Soviet "elements" ~386,798 killed (mostly ethnic Ukrainians)
NKVD Order No. 00447 
Family members of traitors to the Motherland
Kharbin Operation of the NKVD ~30,992 killed

National operations of the NKVD 

The operations of this type in this period targeted "foreign" ethnicities (ethnicities with cross-border ties to foreign nation-states), unlike nationally targeted repressions during World War II. According to historian Oleg Khlevniuk, Stalin became concerned about rearguard uprisings that were seen in the Spanish Civil War and believed that "nationalities of foreign governments" posed a threat in border regions, even if they were Soviet citizens whose ancestors had sometimes  lived decades or centuries in the areas controlled by the Soviet Union.

From August 1937 to October 1938, 353,513 people were arrested and 247,157 were shot in the national operations of NKVD. It is estimated that this would make up 34% of the total victims of the Great Purge.

 Polish Operation of the NKVD ~111,091 killed 
 NKVD Order No. 00485
 German Operation of the NKVD ~41,898 killed
 Greek Operation of the NKVD ~20,000—50,000 
 Latvian Operation of the NKVD 16,573 killed
 Korean Operation of the NKVD ~40,000 killed
 Chinese Operation of the NKVD
 Estonian Operation of the NKVD 4,672 killed
 Finnish Operation of the NKVD 8,000–25,000 killed or disappeared

Rollback 

On November 17, 1938 a joint decree No. 81 of Sovnarkom USSR and Central Committee of Communist Party of the Soviet Union Decree about Arrests, Prosecutor Supervision and Course of Investigation and the subsequent order of the NKVD undersigned by Lavrentiy Beria cancelled most of NKVD orders of mass type (but not all, see, e.g., NKVD Order No. 00689) and suspended implementation of death sentences, signifying the end of the Great Purge ("Yezhovshchina").

See also
 Mass killings under communist regimes

References

Political repression in the Soviet Union
Political and cultural purges
NKVD
Great Purge